Thenaruvi is a 1973 Indian Malayalam film, directed and produced by Kunchacko. The film stars Prem Nazir, Vijayasree, Adoor Bhasi, G. K. Pillai and K. P. Ummer in the lead roles. The film had musical score by G. Devarajan.

Cast

Prem Nazir as Rajan, Mannan (double role)
Sathyan as Rajan's brother - shots of Sathyan used from the movie 'Kaattuthulasi'
Vijayasree as Neeli/Madhavi
Vijayanirmala as Sudha
Adoor Bhasi as Raman Nair
G. K. Pillai as Vakkeel
K. P. Ummer as Madhusudhanan
Sumithra as Ichira
KPAC Lalitha  as Mariyamma
Kaduvakulam Antony as Lazar
Radhika as Rajan's mother
S. P. Pillai as Thulasi's father
Ushakumari as Thulasi
Adoor Pankajam as Kotha
Alummoodan as Swami
Manavalan Joseph as Swami
Aryad Gopalakrishnan as Cheeran
Vijayakala 
Baby Indira as Devi

Soundtrack
The music was composed by G. Devarajan and the lyrics were written by Vayalar Ramavarma.

References

External links
 

1973 films
1970s Malayalam-language films
'Kattuthulasi2